Madhok is an Indian (Khatri) surname. Notable people with the surname include:

Balraj Madhok (born 1920), Indian politician
D. N. Madhok (1902–1982), Indian lyricist
Michelle Madhok (born 1971), American chief executive
Niketan Madhok (born 1976), Indian model
Sujata Madhok, Indian activist and writer

Indian surnames
Surnames of Indian origin
Social groups of Punjab, India
Punjabi-language surnames
Punjabi tribes
Hindu surnames
Khatri clans
Khatri surnames